Ruri Lully Miura is a Japanese essayist and academic in the field of International Politics.

Biography 
Miura graduated from the University of Tokyo and the Graduate School of Public Policy (GraSPP), and completed a PhD at the Graduate School for Law and Politics of the University of Tokyo. She was a researcher at the Policy Alternatives Research Institute (PARI) of the University of Tokyo until 2013, when she was appointed a lecturer.

Miura has founded her own think tank, Yamaneko Research Institute, Inc.

References

External link
 (in Japanese)
YAMANEKO RESEARCH

Living people
Anti-Korean sentiment in Japan
University of Tokyo alumni
Japanese political scientists
Year of birth missing (living people)
Xenophobia